Saint Kitts and Nevis competed at the 2014 Summer Youth Olympics, in Nanjing, China from 16 August to 28 August 2014.

Athletics

Saint Kitts and Nevis qualified two athletes.

Qualification Legend: Q=Final A (medal); qB=Final B (non-medal); qC=Final C (non-medal); qD=Final D (non-medal); qE=Final E (non-medal)

Boys
Track & road events

Girls
Field events

Table Tennis

Saint Kitts and Nevis was given a quota to compete by the tripartite committee.

Singles

Team

Qualification Legend: Q=Main Bracket (medal); qB=Consolation Bracket (non-medal)

References

2014 in Saint Kitts and Nevis
Nations at the 2014 Summer Youth Olympics
2014